Amanda J. Bermudez is an American author and screenwriter. Her short fiction and screenwriting have won a number of awards, including the PAGE International Screenwriting Award (iCON, 2021), the Alpine Fellowship Writing Prize ("The Lady Will Pay for Everything", 2021), and the Iowa Short Fiction Award (Stories No One Hopes Are About Them, University of Iowa Press, 2022). Her films have been produced in the U.S. and internationally, and her literary writing has appeared in McSweeney's, Virginia Quarterly Review, Story, Chicago Review, The Masters Review, Fiction International, Electric Literature, Boulevard, Creative Nonfiction, and elsewhere.

Personal life

Bermudez grew up in various parts of the United States, and after graduating high school at age 16, she moved to Russia, where she worked as a music translator and with the Afghan refugee population in Moscow. Prior to screenwriting, Bermudez worked as an EMT.

In interviews, Bermudez has talked about the loss of her parents at a young age, and has described "writing, like mourning, [as] a constant negotiation between the political and the personal."

Career

Bermudez has been a vocal advocate of social justice and the arts. In 2019, she was named one of the Top 25 Screenwriters to Watch by the International Screenwriters Association. Her debut book was called a "must-read" by Publishers Weekly and was described by Anthony Marra as "an absolutely brilliant collection, so of the moment formally and politically yet timeless in its pursuit of human contradiction."

Bermudez was announced as co-editor of The Maine Review in January 2022. As a writer, Bermudez's work has been noted to focus on "intersections of power, privilege, and place," with characters who subvert traditional ideas of literary protagonists.

In 2022, Bermudez was one of the inaugural residents artists of the Nawat Fes Residency in Fez, Morocco.

Awards & Honors

{| class="wikitable sortable"
!Year
!Work
!Accolade
!Result
!Ref
|-
! scope="row" | 2023
| Stories No One Hopes Are About Them
| Lambda Literary Award
| Finalist
| 
|-
! scope="row" | 2023
| "Picking the Wound"
| Best Small Fictions
| Nominee
| 
|-
! scope="row" | 2022
| Stories No One Hopes Are About Them
| Iowa Short Fiction Award
| Winner
| 
|-
! scope="row" | 2022
| Stories No One Hopes Are About Them
| The Story Prize
| Nominee
| 
|-
! scope="row" | 2021
| iCON
| PAGE International Screenwriting Award
| Winner
| 
|-
! scope="row" | 2021
| "The Lady Will Pay for Everything"
| Alpine Fellowship Writing Prize
| Winner
| 
|-
! scope="row" | 2021
| "Obscure Trivia of the Antarctic"
| Pushcart Prize
| Nominee
| 
|-
! scope="row" | 2021
| "Octopus"
| Adina Talve-Goodman Fellowship
| Finalist
| 
|-
! scope="row" | 2020
| Self
| SmokeLong Fellowship for Emerging Writers
| Finalist
| 
|-
! scope="row" | 2019
| Self
| Top 25 Screenwriters to Watch
| Selection
| 
|-
! scope="row" | 2018
| Nightingale
| Best 60-Minute Teleplay
| Winner
| 
|-
! scope="row" | 2018
| Nightingale
| Emerging Screenwriters Award
| Winner
| 
|-
! scope="row" | 2017
| The Face of the Earth
| Diverse Voices Award
| Winner
| 
|-

Bibliography

 Stories No One Hopes Are About Them (University of Iowa Press)
 "The Real India" (Virginia Quarterly Review)
 "Bottle Girl" (Electric Literature)
 "All the Places You Will Never Be Again" (Chicago Quarterly Review)
 "Misery & Company" (Creative Nonfiction)
 "Rabbitfish" (SmokeLong Quarterly)
 "Ori Dreams of a Tree" (City in a Wild Garden: Stories of the Nature of Cities)
 "The Third Trip" (Coastal Shelf)
 "Octopus" (Story)
 "Conservancy" (Litro)
 "The Voice as Heirloom" (Fiction International)
 "Obscure Trivia of the Antarctic" (Boulevard)
 "Mnemophobe" (Chicago Review)
 "Rosa" (Every Day Fiction)
 "Fall" (The Baltimore Review)
 "Ní de Aqui, Ní de Alla" (Arachne Press)
 "Casualty" (Columbia Journal)
 "Water & Earth" (Bad Bride)
 "Orphea" (Fearsome Critters)
 "Insertion" (The Offing)
 "Maslow’s Hierarchy of Post-Pandemic Wish Fulfillment Fantasies" (McSweeney’s)
 "The Body Electric" (Gertrude Press)
 "Walk-Off" (Hobart)
 "On the Negligible Proximity of Money and Mouths" (Heirlock)
 "Year of the Snake" (The Masters Review)
 "Totenhaus" (Black Static)
 "Eating the Leaves" (Lunch Ticket)
 "Sabbatical" (Cheap Pop)
 "Cain vs. Cain" (Iron Horse Literary Review)
 "Disenchantment" (Spider Road Press)
 "The Breakneck Boys" (Concīs)

References 

Living people
21st-century American screenwriters
American expatriates in Russia
21st-century American translators
21st-century American short story writers
American women screenwriters
21st-century American women writers
American women short story writers
Emergency medical technicians
Year of birth missing (living people)